The American Museum of Science and Energy (AMSE) is a science museum in Oak Ridge, Tennessee, designed to teach children and adults about energy, especially nuclear power, and to document the role Oak Ridge played in the Manhattan Project. The museum opened as the American Museum of Atomic Energy in 1949 in an old World War II cafeteria on Jefferson Circle. It moved to its second facility in 1975 and was renamed AMSE in 1978. As of June 2019, the museum is located in the shopping mall across the street from the old location.

Exhibits and tours

The museum has both permanent and rotating exhibits, including robots, science puzzles, a NOAA weather station, a timeline of atomic discoveries, a large Van de Graaff generator, a display devoted to nuclear weapons and the Y-12 Plant, and a solar energy demonstration project. Its flagship exhibit, titled "Secret City - The Oak Ridge Story", was completely redesigned and rebuilt in 2007. A World War II-vintage flat top house, one of many inhabited by Manhattan Project workers in Oak Ridge, opened as a walk-through attraction in 2009, but was moved to the grounds of the Children's Museum of Oak Ridge in 2018 and is now used by the Manhattan Project National Historical Park as part of a display of the history of Oak Ridge. Several photos by Ed Westcott are on display.

The museum also provides bus tours of the local sites of the Manhattan Project National Historical Park including the X-10 Graphite Reactor National Historic Landmark, the Y-12 National Security Complex and the East Tennessee Technology Park, located on the site of the K-25 Building.

The K-25 History Center, a 7,500-square foot museum operated by AMSE opened at the K-25 site in 2020.

The museum is open seven days a week. The museum was free to the public for many years when its operation was fully funded by the U.S. federal government, but now charges for admission. The museum is a Smithsonian Affiliate.

History

The museum was established in 1949 as the "American Museum of Atomic Energy". In 1975, the museum constructed a new building at 300 South Tulane Avenue. The museum was located there until 2018, when the museum moved to a new yet smaller building on Main Street. The one-story building has .

See also
 Bradbury Science Museum
 National Atomic Testing Museum
 National Museum of Nuclear Science & History

References

External links

 
 K-25 History Center

Museums established in 1949
Oak Ridge, Tennessee
Museums in Anderson County, Tennessee
Science museums in Tennessee
Smithsonian Institution affiliates
Energy museums in the United States
1949 establishments in Tennessee